The ARM Cortex-A5 is a 32-bit processor core licensed by ARM Holdings implementing the ARMv7-A architecture announced in 2009.

Overview

The Cortex-A5 is intended to replace the ARM9 and ARM11 cores for use in low-end devices. The Cortex-A5 offers features of the ARMv7 architecture focusing on internet applications e.g. VFPv4 and NEON advanced SIMD.

Key features of the Cortex-A5 core are:
 Single-issue, in-order microarchitecture with an 8-stage pipeline
 NEON SIMD instruction set extension (optional)
 VFPv4 floating-point unit (optional)
 Thumb-2 instruction set encoding
 Jazelle RCT
 1.57 DMIPS / MHz

Chips
Several system-on-chips (SoC) have implemented the Cortex-A5 core, including:
 Actions Semiconductor ATM7029 (gs702a) is a quad-core Cortex-A5 configuration
 AMD APUs include a Cortex-A5 as a security co-processor
 Amlogic S805, M805 and A111
 Analog Devices ADSP-SC57x, ADSP-SC58x series ARM Cortex-A5 + SHARC+ multicore DSP
 Atmel SAMA5Dxx
 Freescale Vybrid Series
 NTC Module 1879VM8Ya (penta-core Cortex-A5, up to 800 MHz)
 Qualcomm Snapdragon S1 MSM7x25A / MSM7x27A (up to 1.0GHz + Adreno 200)
 Qualcomm Snapdragon S4 Play
 Samsung Exynos 7420 (Cortex-A5 as an audio DSP)
 Spreadtrum SC8810 (single core A5 1 GHz + Mali400 GPU)
 All AMD CPUs since the Zen microarchitecture contain a Cortex-A5 as a Platform Security Processor

Development platform

See also

 ARM architecture
 Comparison of ARMv7-A microarchitectures
 JTAG
 List of applications of ARM microarchitectures
 List of ARM microarchitectures

References

External links
ARM Holdings
 
 ARM Cortex-A5 Technical Reference Manuals

ARM processors
ARM Holdings IP cores